A secret combination, in the accounts of the Book of Mormon, is a term that describes a malignant secret society of "people bound together by oaths to carry out the evil purposes of the group." Secret combinations were first discussed in the Book of Mormon, which was published in 1830 by Joseph Smith. The most notable example of a secret combination is the Gadianton robbers, a conspiracy throughout much of the narrative of the Book of Mormon. According to the Joseph Smith Translation of the Bible, Cain also entered a secret combination with Satan and became Master Mahan.

Book of Mormon
The Book of Mormon is a religious text, held by the Latter Day Saints to be record of several groups of people in ancient America. Adherents teach that prophets of these people proclaimed principles and warnings for believers. Moroni, a Nephite prophet, addresses his words to later generations and speaks of secret combinations in the Book of Ether: "When ye shall see these things [secret combinations] come among you that ye shall awake to a sense of your awful situation."

The Book of Mormon denounces secret combinations as "most abominable and wicked above all, in the sight of God." They are also considered to be one of the signs that a people is ripe for the Lord's vengeance, and according to the Book of Mormon, in the last days, they will be prevalent on the earth.

Moroni also warns that the Gentiles of the latter day should repent of their sins and not allow that "murderous combinations get above you, which are built up to get power and gain." Moroni goes on to warn that anyone who builds up a secret combination "seeketh to overthrow the freedom of all lands, nations, and countries; and it bringeth to pass the destruction of all people, for it is built up by the devil, who is the father of all lies."

Moroni tells an example of a secret combination in the story of a son, Jared, who rebels against his father Omer, the Jaredite king of the land. After trying once and not succeeding in the overthrow of his father, Jared's daughter tells him of the power of conspiracy and refers to ancient writings of "secret plans to obtain kingdoms and great glory." She devises a plan to establish her father as ruler of the land, telling him that she can dance for Akish, a man of authority, and entice him. If Akish is pleased with her and desires to wed her, as a condition he must agree to deliver the head of Jared's father, King Omer. To fulfill Jared's wish, Akish forms a circle of men who swear upon their lives that they will never divulge the secret, their plot, or the identities of their brethren. To join the secret group, one has to perform a series of oaths administered by Akish. Moroni explains that the promises or covenants are "kept up by the power of the devil" through the ages.

After finishing the account, Moroni tells of the effect the secret combination had upon the nation: "They have caused the destruction of this people of whom I am now speaking, and also the destruction of the people of Nephi."

Another group said to be practicing secret combinations in the Book of Mormon are the Gadianton robbers.

In the modern world
During the Cold War, Ezra Taft Benson, an apostle of the Church of Jesus Christ of Latter-day Saints (LDS Church), repeatedly described communism as a secret combination. As church president, Benson stated that "a secret combination that seeks to overthrow the freedom of all lands, nations, and countries is increasing its evil influence and control over America and the entire world." Another LDS Church leader, Bruce R. McConkie of the Council of the Seventy, claimed, "Reliable modern reports describe their existence among gangsters, as part of the governments of communist countries, in some labor organizations, and even in some religious groups."

LDS Church apostle M. Russell Ballard described secret combinations as including "gangs, drug cartels, and organized crime families... They have secret signs and code words. They participate in secret rites and initiation ceremonies. Among their purposes are to 'murder, and plunder, and steal, and commit whoredoms and all manner of wickedness, contrary to the laws of their country and also the laws of their God.'" LDS Church President Gordon B. Hinckley compared modern terrorists to the "Gadianton robbers, a vicious, oath-bound, and secret organization bent on evil and destruction."

See also

Mormon folklore
Mormonism and Freemasonry

References 

Book of Mormon words and phrases
Secrecy